Mutual Trust Bank Limited (Bengali: মিউচুয়াল ট্রাস্ট ব্যাংক লিমিটেড) is a private commercial bank headquartered in Dhaka, Bangladesh. Md Abdul Malek, chairmanSheltech Consultants (Pvt) Ltd, is the chairman of Mutual Trust Bank Limited.

The Company was incorporated as a Public Limited Company in 1999, under the Companies Act 1994, with an Authorized Share Capital of BDT 1,000,000,000 divided into 10,000,000 ordinary shares of BDT 100 each. At present, the Authorized Share Capital of the company is BDT 10,000,000,000 divided into 1,000,000,000 ordinary shares of BDT 10 each.

History
Mutual Trust Bank Limited was established on 29 September 1999. Syed Manzur Elahi was the founding chairman of the Bank. Harris Chowdhury, former political secretary to Prime Minister Khaleda Zia, was a shareholder of the bank.

In April 2007, Bangladesh Bank found evidence that Nurunnabi, a Chittagong businessman had embezled 6.28 billion BDT from 10 banks using false documents under 32 company names. It included one billion BDT from Mutual Trust Bank branch in Khatunganj. In 2009, Anis A Khan was appointed managing director of Mutual Trust Bank Limited.

In July 2013, Bangladesh Police arrested an IT officer of Mutual Trust Bank Limited for being involved in an ATM forgery case.

In 2015, the bank became one of two local partners of Life Insurance Corporation of India in Bangladesh. The Daily Star 15th Bangladesh Business Awards described the bank as "one of the best-run banks in Bangladesh". Anis A Khan was re-appointed managing director of Mutual Trust Bank Limited in 2015 for a four year term.

Norfund, the investment fund of the Norwegian government announced plans to purchase 10 per cent of Mutual Trust Bank Limited in September 2018.

According to the Anti-Corruption Commission in December 2019, a manager of the Mutual Trust Bank Limited had stolen 49.9 million taka from a client of the bank.

MTB Foundation is the charity arm of Mutual Trust Bank Limited. The MTB Foundation announced the creation of Niloufer Manzur Memorial Scholarship named after Niloufer Manzur, principal of Sunbeams School in November 2021.

In May 2022, Associated Builders Corporations (ABC Group) announced plans to sell 27 per cent shares of the Mutual Trust Bank Limited at the block market to be purchased by an independent director of ABC Group, Rashed Ahmed Chowdhury. Chairman of Bangladesh Securities and Exchange Commission, Prof Shibli-Rubayat-Ul Islam, approved the sale of 5 billion BDT worth of bonds by Mutual Trust Bank Limited. In August the bank signed a cash management agreement with the Paragon Group.

Memberships 
The Institute of Bankers, Bangladesh
Bangladesh Association of Banks
Bangladesh Foreign Exchange Dealer Association
Bangladesh Institute of Bank Management
 Bangladesh Association of Publicly Listed Companies
Metropolitan Chamber of Commerce and Industry, Dhaka
International Chamber of Commerce Bangladesh
Dhaka Stock Exchange
Dhaka Chamber of Commerce & Industry
Federation of Bangladesh Chambers of Commerce and Industry
American Chamber of Commerce in Bangladesh
Primary Dealers Bangladesh Limited

References

 

Companies listed on the Dhaka Stock Exchange
Banks established in 1999
1999 establishments in Bangladesh
Square Group